|}

The Red Rum Handicap Chase is a Grade 3 National Hunt steeplechase in Great Britain which is open to horses aged five years or older. It is run on the Mildmay course at Aintree over a distance of about 2 miles (1 mile, 7 furlongs and 176 yards, or ), and during its running there are twelve fences to be jumped. It is a handicap race, and it is scheduled to take place each year in early April.

The event is named in memory of Red Rum, a three-time winner of the Grand National in the 1970s. It was formerly known as the Aintree Chase, and it was retitled the Red Rum Chase in 1997.

The race used to be contested as a limited handicap (a race where a restricted weight range is specified), and it was given Grade 2 status in 1991. It became a standard handicap in 2001, and since then it has been called the Red Rum Handicap Chase. This version was initially classed at Listed level, and it was promoted to Grade 3 status in 2004.

Winners since 1976
 Weights given in stones and pounds.

See also
 Horse racing in Great Britain
 List of British National Hunt races

References

 Racing Post:
 
 thejockeyclub.co.uk/aintree/ – 2010 John Smith's Grand National Media Guide.
 pedigreequery.com – Red Rum Chase – Aintree.
 

National Hunt races in Great Britain
Aintree Racecourse
National Hunt chases